Gymnopilus karrara is a species of mushroom in the family Hymenogastraceae.

See also

List of Gymnopilus species

External links
Gymnopilus karrara at Index Fungorum

karrara
Fungi of North America
Taxa named by Cheryl A. Grgurinovic